Eretmocera letabensis is a moth of the family Scythrididae. It was described by Bengt Å. Bengtsson in 2014. It is found in Namibia and South Africa (Limpopo).

References

letabensis
Moths described in 2014
Moths of Africa